Sekolah Menengah Kebangsaan Sentul Utama, or SMKSU, is a morning-session  public coeducational secondary school located in Malaysia. The school is known for its architecture and building design which is the second tallest building in Malaysia.

History 
SMKSU was established in 2010 with Form 1, Form 2 and Form 4.   The students were under the supervision of Puan Hajah Maznah Binti Haji Mazlan, the ex-principal of SMK Setapak Indah. Initially there were 200-300 students. Now the number of students is above 800.

Principals 
 Puan Hajah Maznah Haji Mazlan (2010-2014)
 Puan Norsiah Yahya (2014–present)

Head Prefects 
 2010-2011 - Dhivien Sean Raj A/L Selva Kumaran
 2011-2012 - Syafiq Abdul Latiff
 2012-2013 - Nik Nur Muhammad Ameer Nik Zainudin
 2013-2014 - Prasana A/P Arasu
 2014-2015 - Muhammad Syahrul Nizam
 2015-2016 - Wan Nur Arina
 2016-2017 - M.Ammar Faruq
 2017-2018 - Tan kar Hoe
 2018-2019 - M.Hafiz

Head Librarians
 2016-2017 - Nur Syahirah Azman
 2017-2018 - Zakirah Nur Alya
 2018-2019 - Nur Aina Ashikin

Motto
Knowledgeable, Well-mannered, Visionary.

Facilities
SMKSU has two blocks of class rooms, labs, an Academic block, Staff room, Office, Examination room, Library, Multimedia room and a Meeting room. Besides that the school has a canteen, a multi-purpose hall and two computer labs.

Secondary schools in Malaysia
Schools in Kuala Lumpur